G. Milton Small and Associates Office Building is a historic home and office located on Brooks Avenue in Raleigh, Wake County, North Carolina.  It was designed by architect G. Milton Small (1916-1992), who also designed the Small House, and built in 1966.  It is a one floor, steel-frame Miesian style building that covers most of a 69-foot by 155-foot flat lot.  It features grids of aluminum mullions carrying metal panels and sheets of glass, and an overhanging flat roof.  It housed the architecture firm of G. Milton Small and Associates.

It was listed on the National Register of Historic Places in 1994.

References 

Office buildings on the National Register of Historic Places in North Carolina
Modernist architecture in North Carolina
Office buildings completed in 1966
Buildings and structures in Raleigh, North Carolina
National Register of Historic Places in Raleigh, North Carolina